Sierra de Cubitas Municipal Museum is a museum located in Sierra de Cubitas, Cuba. It was established on 20 December 1982.

The museum holds collections on history and weaponry.

See also 
 List of museums in Cuba
 Sola (Sierra de Cubitas)

References 

Museums in Cuba
Buildings and structures in Camagüey Province
Museums established in 1982
1982 establishments in Cuba
20th-century architecture in Cuba